Abū Manṣūr ʿAbd al-Qāhir ibn Ṭāhir bin Muḥammad bin ʿAbd Allāh al-Tamīmī al-Shāfiʿī al-Baghdādī was an Arab Shafi'i scholar, Usul Imam, heresiologist and mathematician.

Early life and education 
'Abd al-Qahir al-Baghdadi was born and raised in Baghdad. He was a member of the Arab tribe of Banu Tamim. He received his education in Nishabur and subsequently taught 17 subjects, including law, usul, arithmetic, law of inheritance and theology. Most of the scholars of Khurasan were his pupils. Ibn 'Asakir writes that Abu Mansur met the companions of the companions of Imam al-Ashari and acquired knowledge from them.

Works 
'Abd al-Qahir al-Baghdadi wrote several books including Kitāb Uṣūl al-Dīn, a systematic treatise, beginning with the nature of knowledge, creation, how the Creator is known, His attributes, etc.... and Al-Farq bayn al-Firaq which takes each sect separately, judges all from the standpoint of orthodoxy and condemns all which deviate from the straight path. Both books were major works on the beliefs of Ahl al-Sunna.

He also wrote the treatise al-Takmila fi'l-Hisab which contains results in number theory, and comments on works by al-Khwarizmi which are now lost.

See also 
List of Arab scientists and scholars.

References

External links 
 

Mathematicians from the Abbasid Caliphate
People from Baghdad
1037 deaths
980s births
10th-century people from the Abbasid Caliphate
11th-century people from the Abbasid Caliphate
10th-century mathematicians
11th-century mathematicians
Shafi'is
Asharis
11th-century jurists
10th-century Arabs
11th-century Arabs